William Edward Poulson (1862 – 23 January 1937) was an English footballer. He was a one-club man for Port Vale, possibly also being one of its founders.

Career
Poulson played left-back in Port Vale's first recorded line-up on 9 December 1882 in a 5–1 defeat at nearby Stoke in a Staffordshire Senior Cup second round replay. In fact he was most probably a founder-member of the club in the late 1870s. With Vale he won numerous trophies, including the North Staffordshire Charity Challenge Cup in 1883 and 1885 and was also a scorer in the Burslem Challenge Cup final on 21 March 1885, which was won 12–0 against Ironbridge. By December 1889 though he began to appear less frequently in the first 11 and was most likely released at the end of the 1890–91 season. He had scored 15 goals in 225 games for the club, playing in some nine positions over his twelve or so years for the Vale.

Career statistics
Source:

Honours
Port Vale
North Staffordshire Charity Challenge Cup: 1883, 1885 (shared)
Burslem Challenge Cup: 1885

References

1862 births
1937 deaths
Sportspeople from Hanley, Staffordshire
English footballers
Association football midfielders
Port Vale F.C. players
Midland Football League players